Legacy High School is an alternative high school in Vancouver, Clark County, Washington.  Legacy is the only alternative high school in the Evergreen Public Schools school district and has the lowest student enrollment. Legacy High School's principal is Andy Schoonover. Legacy's school colors are green and black.

The school does not have an official mascot. However, unofficial mascots include Sasquatch and Llamas.

Academics
Legacy has a relatively high graduation rate. But based on its moderate state test results, it has received a GreatSchools Rating of 5 out of 10.

References

External links
OSPI state school report card 2012-13

High schools in Vancouver, Washington
Public high schools in Washington (state)
Alternative schools in the United States